Greg, Gregg or Gregory Marshall may refer to:

Sportsmen
Greg Marshall (defensive lineman) (born 1956), Canadian Football League player and coach (Saskatchewan Roughriders, Edmonton Eskimos)
Greg Marshall (running back) (born 1959), Canadian Football League player and coach (McMaster University, University of Western Ontario)
Gregg Marshall (born 1963), American college basketball coach

Others
Gregory Marshall (1939–1989), American child and adolescent actor
Greg Marshall (born 1973), English Labour Party candidate in 2019 Broxtowe (UK Parliament constituency)#Elections in the 2010s

Characters
Greg Marshall (Home and Away), appeared on Australian TV soap opera in 1991–93 and 2000